Read Yourself RAW is a comic anthology collecting the non-Maus contents of the first three issues of the magazine RAW, edited by Art Spiegelman and Françoise Mouly and published in October 1987 by Pantheon Books.

Origin 
The contents of Read Yourself Raw are a selection of comics by various artists originally published from Raw magazine issues one to three, a comics anthology that circulated from 1980 to 1991. Read Yourself Raw is a selection of comic works that was originally published in issues one to three of Raw. It also includes the original covers, illustrations, and reprints of the inserts that were in those issues. Read Yourself Raw gives readers a taste of some of Raw'''s contents.

 Contents Read Yourself Raw omits Maus from its collection. Instead, it strictly desires to showcase the comic works from artists, and international artists who deserve to receive more attention and larger readership in the United States. Since Raw is out of print and had a limited run, the original issues are rare. Read Yourself Raw became the only way to get a rerelease of some of the works published from Raw issues one to three because there were no reprintings and these older issues were often resold at a marked-up price.

One unique characteristic of both Read Yourself Raw and Raw is that it is difficult even for the editor himself, Art Spiegelman, to define the magazine and who its intended audience is for. He says in Read Yourself Raw: 

And Francoise Mouly defines her editorial decisions for Raw as:

As a reader flips through the pages, they are exposed to design and art that set itself apart from other comics and magazines published during the 1980s. From the outset, both Raw and Read Yourself Raw stand out on the newsstand or bookshelves. Both book’s oversized format is printed on intricate, die-cut covers of which some were hand-ripped and re-tape that speaks to its high production values, and attention to detail. Read Yourself Raw also includes recreations of the bubble-gum cards was stapled into the original issues. These many handmade interventions and special inserts characterizes Mouly’s intention to challenge “the prejudice against comics as toilet literature, that they should be printed only on newsprint and disposable.” Instead, both Raw and Read Yourself Raw promote the idea of comics being a unique, collectible product. Spigelman and Mouly published the innovative comic works that explored new ground through experimentation, self-expression, and artistic exploration in a striking avant-garde, messy, and neoexpressionist comic styles in both art and story.

 Styles and influence 
Readers will see in Read Yourself Raw the complexities found in the tension between the art and the drawings that calls for mature readers and to be taken seriously. As a result, comics published in Read Yourself Raw challenges the notion that comics’ intended audience only as one for children. Read Yourself Raw and, in broader context, Raw were seminal works that helped to define the age of alternative comics in the 1980s. As a formative work, studying the comics and graphic work published in Read Yourself Raw allows for a closer study of the cultural phenomenon that was alternative comics.Manhattan, by Jacques Tardi, is one of the comics in Read Yourself Raw that is a key example of the striking contrast to the mainstream superhero comics prevalent during this decade. Manhattan premiered in the first issue of Raw, with Tardi’s work being exposed to American readers for the first time. The visual style is completely drawn in high black and white contrast, and explores mature and darker themes that differs from the four colour CYMK that is distinctive of superhero comics. Overall, the story was “instrumental in defining both that magazine’s virtuoso aesthetic and its dark sensibility.” The story follows a male protagonist’s depressing and dark metacognitions as he walks through the streets of Manhattan, New York City by himself. At the end, readers are left contemplating over whether he committed suicide as the panels pan away the city’s skyline, trying to make sense of his actions in juxtaposition to his thoughts. These types of autobiographical, and emotionally realistic comics were just beginning to emerge to the comic book scene and only made possible by innovative publications like Read Yourself Raw.The cultural significance of Read Yourself Raw in juxtaposition to the mainstream comic book industry is its role in the trajectory of the countercultural comix movement, and the diversification of comic book styles. Readers will see in Read Yourself Raw the complexities found in the tension between the art and the drawings that calls for mature readers and to be taken seriously. As a result, comics published in Read Yourself Raw'' challenges the notion that comics’ intended audience only as one for children.

References 

Pantheon Books comics titles